Mudie is a surname. Notable people with the surname include:

 Charles Edward Mudie (1818–1890), English publisher
 George Mudie (politician) (born 1945), British politician
 George Mudie (cricketer) (1915–2002), West Indian cricketer
 George Mudie (social reformer) (born 1788), Scottish advocate of co-operativism, journalist, and publisher
 Harold Bolingbroke Mudie (1880–1916), British esperantist
 Harry Mudie (born circa 1940), Jamaican record producer
 Ian Mudie (1911–1976), Australian poet
 Jackie Mudie (1930–1992), Scottish international footballer
 James Mudie (1779–1852), Scottish-born free settler of Australia
 Jenny Mudie, Scottish cricketer
 Francis Mudie (1890–1976), British administrator in British India
 Leonard Mudie (1883–1965), British-born character actor
 Robert Mudie (1777–1842) Scottish author
 Thomas Molleson Mudie (1809–1876), British composer
 William Henry Mudie (1830–1903), Australian priest and educator

See also

 Mudi